Franciszek Krajowski (born ; September 30, 1861 in Velešín, south Bohemia (then in Austrian Empire) – November 22, 1932 in Brest) was a Czech-Poles military officer and a General of the Polish Army.

He started his career in the Austro-Hungarian Army.

After World War I he joined the Polish Army and served as a commanding officer of various units on the fronts of the Polish-Ukrainian War and the Polish-Soviet War. Until 1922 he commanded the 9th Corps Area in Brześć nad Bugiem (Brest). Retired, he settled in that town where he died November 22, 1932.

1861 births
1932 deaths
People from Velešín
Austro-Hungarian Army officers
Polish generals
Polish people of Czech descent
Austro-Hungarian military personnel of World War I
Polish people of the Polish–Ukrainian War
Polish people of the Polish–Soviet War